Jaspers Lai Yit Hann (born March 7, 1987) is a Malaysian-born Singaporean actor.

Early life 
Lai studied in Nanyang Junior College. Thereafter, Lai went to Hong Kong to be trained in acting, hosting, singing and songwriting when he was 18, and was in training for 5 years, along with  Romeo Tan and Andie Chen. However, the artiste management company shuttered when he was 23 before he could debut. He returned to Singapore and enrolled into National University of Singapore, studying at the School of Computing.

Career 
While studying in NUS, he was a VJ in in988, an internet radio station. 

In 2014, Lai made his film debut in The Lion Men. In the movie, he was cast as Sam, the leader of a rivalling lion dance troupe. He was selected for the role after passing an audition during his final university semester, and was also signed with Jack Neo's J-team Productions. However, acting jobs were scant for Lai, with him filming a movie once a year. 

While attending a scriptwriting course, Lai started to develop the script, for what would eventually become the 2020 film Number 1, based on his personal experiences. While developing the script still, and appearing in Wonderful! Liang Xi Mei in 2018, his co-actor, Mark Lee found out about the script and immediately staked for a role in the film. After the movie was released in 2020, the film received two nominations at the 57th Golden Horse Awards. It won one award for Best Costume & Makeup Design.

In 2021, Lai received the Most Talented Chinese Arstiste Award (最有才华艺人奖) from the World Chinese Economic Forum.

Filmography

Film

Television series

Variety series

Discography

Singles

References

1987 births
Living people
Singaporean male actors
Singaporean people of Hakka descent
Singaporean screenwriters